Aldegonde Jeanne Pauli (1685–1761), was a politically influential banker in the Austrian Netherlands.

She married the merchant, maritime insurer and financier Pietro Proli, and took over the Proli Bank when he died in 1733. She handled most of the loans of the imperial government in Vienna in the Low countries and was famous for her business skills. She left it to her son Charles, but the power of the government loans in the Austrian Netherlands moved from the Proli bank to the Nettine Bank of Barbe de Nettine under his leadership.

See also
 Isabella Simons

Sources
 Béatrice Craig: Women and Business Since 1500: Invisible Presences in Europe and North America?

1685 births
1761 deaths
Businesspeople of the Austrian Netherlands
18th-century Dutch businesswomen
18th-century Dutch businesspeople
Dutch bankers
Women bankers
Women of the Austrian Netherlands